= Keith McKean =

Canadian Anglican priest

Robert Keith McKean was a Canadian Anglican priest in the second half of the 20th century. McKean was educated at the University of Manitoba. Ordained in 1961, his first post was a curacy at st Aidan, Winnipeg. He was Rector of St Alban, Winnipeg from 1962 to 1965; All Saints, Peterborough, Ontario from 1965. He was Archdeacon of Peterborough from 1974.
